This page lists all described species of the spider family Microstigmatidae accepted by the World Spider Catalog :

A

Angka

Angka Raven & Schwendinger, 1995
 A. hexops Raven & Schwendinger, 1995 (type) — Thailand

E

Envia

Envia Ott & Höfer, 2003
 E. garciai Ott & Höfer, 2003 (type) — Brazil
 E. moleque Miglio & Bonaldo, 2011 — Brazil

I

Ixamatus

Ixamatus Simon, 1887
 I. barina Raven, 1982 — Australia (Queensland)
 I. broomi Hogg, 1901 — Australia (Queensland, New South Wales)
 I. caldera Raven, 1982 — Australia (Queensland, New South Wales)
 I. candidus Raven, 1982 — Australia (Queensland, New South Wales)
 I. fischeri Raven, 1982 — Australia (New South Wales)
 I. lornensis Raven, 1985 — Australia (New South Wales)
 I. musgravei Raven, 1982 — Australia (New South Wales)
 I. rozefeldsi Raven, 1985 — Australia (Queensland)
 I. varius (L. Koch, 1873) (type) — Australia (Queensland)
 I. webbae Raven, 1982 — Australia (Queensland, New South Wales)

K

Kiama

Kiama Main & Mascord, 1969
 K. lachrymoides Main & Mascord, 1969 (type) — Australia (New South Wales)

M

Micromygale

Micromygale Platnick & Forster, 1982
 M. diblemma Platnick & Forster, 1982 (type) — Panama

Microstigmata

Microstigmata Strand, 1932
 M. amatola Griswold, 1985 — South Africa
 M. geophila (Hewitt, 1916) (type) — South Africa
 M. lawrencei Griswold, 1985 — South Africa
 M. longipes (Lawrence, 1938) — South Africa
 M. ukhahlamba Griswold, 1985 — South Africa
 M. zuluensis (Lawrence, 1938) — South Africa

Ministigmata

Ministigmata Raven & Platnick, 1981
 M. minuta Raven & Platnick, 1981 (type) — Brazil

P

† Parvomygale

† Parvomygale Wunderlich, 2004
 † P. distincta Wunderlich, 2004

Pseudonemesia

Pseudonemesia Caporiacco, 1955
 P. kochalkai Raven & Platnick, 1981 — Colombia
 P. parva Caporiacco, 1955 (type) — Venezuela
 P. tabiskey Indicatti & Villareal M., 2016 — Venezuela

S

Spelocteniza

Spelocteniza Gertsch, 1982
 S. ashmolei Gertsch, 1982 (type) — Ecuador

T

Tonton

Tonton Passanha, Cizauskas & Brescovit, 2019
 T. emboaba (Pedroso, Baptista & Bertani, 2015) — Brazil
 T. ipiau Passanha, Cizauskas & Brescovit, 2019 — Brazil
 T. itabirito Passanha, Cizauskas & Brescovit, 2019 (type) — Brazil
 T. matodentro Passanha, Cizauskas & Brescovit, 2019 — Brazil
 T. queca Passanha, Cizauskas & Brescovit, 2019 — Brazil
 T. quiteria Passanha, Cizauskas & Brescovit, 2019 — Brazil
 T. sapalo Passanha, Cizauskas & Brescovit, 2019 — Brazil

X

Xamiatus

Xamiatus Raven, 1981
 X. bulburin Raven, 1981 — Australia (Queensland)
 X. ilara Raven, 1982 — Australia (Queensland)
 X. kia Raven, 1981 — Australia (New South Wales)
 X. magnificus Raven, 1981 — Australia (Queensland)
 X. rubrifrons Raven, 1981 (type) — Australia (Queensland)

Xenonemesia

Xenonemesia Goloboff, 1989
 X. araucaria Indicatti, Lucas, Ott & Brescovit, 2008 — Brazil
 X. otti Indicatti, Lucas & Brescovit, 2007 — Brazil
 X. platensis Goloboff, 1989 (type) — Brazil, Uruguay, Argentina

References

Microstigmatidae